Tillandsia geminiflora is a species in the genus Tillandsia. This species is native to Brazil, Suriname, Paraguay, Uruguay, and the Misiones Province of Argentina.

Two varieties are recognized:

Tillandsia geminiflora var. geminiflora - most of species range
Tillandsia geminiflora var. incana (Wawra) Mez  - Uruguay and southeastern Brazil

Cultivars
 Tillandsia 'Bushfire'
 Tillandsia 'J. R.'
 Tillandsia 'Mystic Twins'
 Tillandsia 'Pink Sugar'
 Tillandsia 'Pink Surprise'

References

geminiflora
Flora of Brazil
Flora of the Atlantic Forest
Plants described in 1834
Taxa named by Adolphe-Théodore Brongniart